Randy Clifford Hawes (born 1947) is a Canadian politician from British Columbia, and previously the mayor of Mission, British Columbia. Hawes was previously a Member of Legislative Assembly of British Columbia representing the provincial riding of Abbotsford-Mission. Hawes was first elected to the British Columbia Legislature in the 2001 provincial general election as the member for Maple Ridge-Mission, and was re-elected in 2005. He was re-elected to represent the new riding of Abbotsford-Mission in 2009.

In that time Hawes' responsibilities as an MLA have included many Health and Social Services roles, including serving as Chair of the Government Caucus Committee on Health, a member of the Legislative Assembly’s Standing Committee on Health, a member of the Project Steering committee for the new Regional Hospital and Cancer Centre in Abbotsford, the Coordinator of the Caucus Outreach Project, and the Caucus Committee on Seniors. He also served as Chief Government Whip from 2005 to 2009 and Minister of State for Mining from 2009 to 2012.

Hawes' MLA responsibilities in the areas of Transportation and Environment included serving as Chair of the Streamside Setback Review committee, Chair of the Fraser Valley Aggregate Pilot Project, a member of the Burrard Thermal Options committee, and the Small-Scale Salvage Review Committee.

In the area of Good Governance, Hawes' MLA responsibilities included serving as Chair of the Special Committee to Appoint a Chief Electoral Officer, a member of the Government Caucus Committee on Communities and Safety, a member of the Select Standing Committee on Public Accounts, a member of the Special Committee to Select a Merit Commissioner, and a member of the Legislative Review Committee.

Prior to his election to the BC Legislature, Hawes was elected in 1993 to the first of three consecutive terms as the Mayor of Mission following a one-year term as a City Councillor. In those capacities he worked to advance services and expand the local tax base. In that time Hawes also served as Chair of the Fraser Valley Regional District, the Fraser Valley Parks Commission and other bodies. In 2014 he was again elected to a 4 year term as Mayor of Mission.

Prior to elected public service, Hawes had a career in bank management and the real estate and property development industries. Hawes' community service began with 15 years of coaching hockey and baseball, and came to include a number of local organizations, including the Mission Community Health Council and the Ferndale Citizens’ Advisory Committee. In addition he is a member of the Mission Mid-Day Rotary Club.

Born in Edmonton in 1947, moved to Mission with his wife Alma in 1979; they have three children.

In spring 2009, Hawes and his wife Alma participated in Food Network Canada's The 100 Mile Challenge.

Election results

References

1947 births
Living people
British Columbia Liberal Party MLAs
Mayors of Mission, British Columbia
Members of the Executive Council of British Columbia
Politicians from Edmonton
21st-century Canadian politicians